Estonian Biathlon Union (abbreviation EBU) is one of the sport governing bodies in Estonia which deals with biathlon.

EBU is established on 11 November 1992. EBU is a member of International Biathlon Union.

References

External links
 

Sports governing bodies in Estonia
Biathlon in Estonia
Biathlon organizations
Sports organizations established in 1992